is a Japanese comedy anime television series by Pierrot, based on Fujio Akatsuka's 1962 manga series, Osomatsu-kun. Celebrating Akatsuka's eightieth birthday, the series follows the sextuplet Matsuno brothers from the original series as adults, and features more adult-oriented humor compared to the original series. The series aired in Japan between October 2015 and March 2016, with a special episode airing in December 2016. A second season aired between October 2017 and March 2018. A third season aired between October 2020 to March 2021. The first two seasons have been licensed in the Americas by Viz Media. A manga adaptation by Masako Shitaro was serialized in Shueisha's You magazine from January 2016 to October 2018, and was transferred to Shueisha's Cookie magazine where it was serialized from November 2018 to November 2020. A theatrical anime film premiered in March 2019.  A second theatrical anime film premiered in July 2022.

Premise
The original Osomatsu-kun series followed the Matsuno brothers; Osomatsu, Karamatsu, Choromatsu, Ichimatsu, Jyushimatsu, and Todomatsu, who are all identical sextuplets who cause mischief. Mr. Osomatsu depicts the brothers as being ten years older than their original counterparts (with the action taking place in a contemporary setting). All of the brothers have now grown up into lazy NEETs, with each brother having developed their own distinguishing personality. The series follows the brothers in their everyday (and occasionally made up) lives.

Characters

Matsuno siblings

The eldest of the sextuplets and self-proclaimed leader of the group. An avid gambler, he spends his time playing pachinko and betting on horses. He often dresses in red.

The second born of the sextuplets. Believes himself to be cooler and more popular than he really is and calls his fan girls "Karamatsu Girls." He occasionally adds English words into his sentences. His distinguishing feature is his thick eyebrows and he often dresses in blue, though he occasionally sports a leather jacket and sunglasses.

The third born and most responsible of the sextuplets. Often acts as straight man to his siblings, but also acts as an otaku. His distinguishing features are his angular mouth, smaller pupils, and his lack of a cowlick. He often dresses in green.

The fourth born of the sextuplets and the sharp-tongued loner of the group. His distinguishing features are his tired eyes, scruffy hair, hunched back, and he often dresses in purple.

The fifth born of the sextuplets. He is very energetic but also quite the airhead, often having no reaction to the wild goings-on. He has a wide open mouth, and a single cowlick compared to the other siblings' two. He often dresses in yellow.

The most outgoing of the sextuplets. Often uses his cuteness as the youngest brother to manipulate others. He has a smaller mouth, and bigger pupils. He often dresses in pink.

Other characters

The heroine of the series, who desperately strives to become a fish-themed idol in order to gain fame and fortune. She has a vicious side when annoyed or side-lined.

Iyami remains virtually unchanged from his original appearance in Osomatsu-kun, but he is returned to a supporting role following his role as main protagonist in the 1980s anime series.

Former rival of the sextuplets, who now runs an oden stand that the Matsuno brothers frequently visit.
 

The sextuplets' parents, whom they still live with even as adults.

Previously the minion of various characters, Hatabō now runs a multi-million dollar company, though still retains his child-like attitude.

The same character as the original.

The same character as the original, who often just says his name.

A cat-themed idol whom Choromatsu is an avid fan of.

A typically voiceless character who makes random appearances throughout the series, either as a joke or an Easter egg.

The sextuplets' high school classmate with a pair of round glasses who admires the sextuplets for who they were in their high school years. Only appears in the theatrical film.
 

Two AI Robots that are sent to help the sextuplets in their everyday lives at the beginning of the third season.

Six female friends who act as female counterparts to the brothers, though they have different personalities.

Production and release

Mr. Osomatsu, produced by Pierrot, aired between October 6, 2015 and March 29, 2016 and was simulcast by Crunchyroll, making it the first piece of Osomatsu-kun media to receive an official English release. The series' first episode, which featured multiple parodies, was removed from streaming sites on November 12, 2015 and is replaced by an original video animation in its home video release. Additionally, the third episode, which features a crude parody of Anpanman, was edited for its BS Japan broadcast and is altered in its home video release. In September 2016, Kanchi Suzuki revealed on his Twitter account that he is interested to make a second season. A special episode, produced in collaboration with the Japan Racing Association, aired on December 12, 2016.

In Australia and New Zealand, Madman Entertainment released the first season on DVD on December 7, 2016, and made the series available on AnimeLab. At their panel in Otakon 2017, Viz Media announced that they have licensed the first two seasons in North, Central and South America and simulcast the second season.

In North America, Viz Media released the first season on Blu-Ray on March 9, 2021. It does not include episode 1. The dub was initially written (including episode 1) and directed by Patrick Seitz, but left the project for other commitments, leaving Christopher Bevins to re-write and re-record the series minus the first episode. Viz Media released the second season on Blu-ray on September 14, 2021.

An anime theatrical film for the franchise was announced in August 2018, with the main staff and cast from the television series returning to reprise their roles. Titled , the film was released on March 15, 2019.

A new 7-episode short series was announced in February 2019, with the main staff and cast from the television series returning to reprise their roles. The shorts ran from March 1 to March 15, 2019.

A third season has been announced in July 2020, which aired from October 13, 2020 to March 30, 2021.

Two new animated theatrical films were announced in June 2021. The first film, titled Mr. Osomatsu: Hipipo-Zoku to Kagayaku Kajitsu, premiered on July 8, 2022. Yoshinori Odaka is directing the film, with the main staff and cast reprising their roles. The second film, titled Mr. Osomatsu: The Soul's Takoyaki Party and the Legendary Sleepover Party, will premiere on July 21, 2023.

Other media
A manga adaptation of Mr. Osomatsu, illustrated by Masako Shitara, began serialization in Shueisha's You magazine on January 15, 2016. It transferred to Shueisha's Cookie magazine in November 2018 after You ended its publication in October of the same year. The manga ended in Cookie on November 26, 2020. A novelization of the anime, written by Yū Mitsuru and illustrated by Naoyuki Asano, was published on July 29, 2016. A serialization focusing on the series' collaboration with the Ultraman franchise, Ultramatsu, is an ongoing manga published on LINE that takes place after the Season 1 finale.

Bandai Namco released a party game based on the series for the Nintendo 3DS on December 22, 2016. An otome game developed by Idea Factory was released for the PlayStation Vita in 2017.

A live action adaptation movie, titled Osomatsu San Movie, was announced in August 2021. This marks the first official live action iteration of the franchise. It is directed by Tsutomu Hanabusa and stars the nine member boy band Snow Man as the Matsuno sextuplets with members Ryōta Miyadate, Shōta Watanabe, and Ryōhei Abe as original characters Period, End, and Close respectively. The group also provided the film's theme song "Brother Beat." The film premiered on March 25, 2022.

References

External links
 Anime official website 
 

2015 anime television series debuts
2016 manga
2017 anime television series debuts
2020 anime television series debuts
Fujio Akatsuka
Japanese comedy films
Josei manga
Madman Entertainment anime

Parody anime and manga
Pierrot (company)
Shueisha manga
TV Tokyo original programming
Viz Media anime